Rehmannia elata, the Chinese foxglove, is a species of flowering plant in the family Orobanchaceae, native to China. The flowers bear a superficial resemblance to foxgloves, hence the common name "Chinese foxglove", which is also applied to the whole genus. However this species is not closely related to the true foxglove (Digitalis).

The plant has gained the Royal Horticultural Society's Award of Garden Merit. 

The specific epithet elata means "tall".

Gallery

References

Flora of China
elata